Taio was a comune (municipality) in Trentino in the northern Italian region Trentino-Alto Adige/Südtirol, located about  north of Trento. It was merged with Coredo, Smarano, Tres and Vervò on January 1, 2015, to form a new municipality, Predaia.

Taio borders the following municipalities: Coredo, Denno, Nanno, Sanzeno, Tassullo, Ton, Tres and Vervò.

Taio included the village of Segno, which is the birthplace of Jesuit missionary Eusebio Kino.

Demographic evolution

References

External links
 Homepage of the city

Cities and towns in Trentino-Alto Adige/Südtirol